Savitri is an Indian fantasy drama television show, which aired on Life OK from 18 February 2013 to October 4, 2013. The initial co-producers were Film Farm India, but before the series went on air, the production was switched to Flying Turtles. In August 2013, a cast revamp was carried out. It is a modern take on the traditional Indian folktale of Savitri and Satyavan from the Mahabharata.

Cast
 Avneet Kaur as Young Damyanti
 Ridhi Dogra as Rajkumari Damyanti / Savitri Satyavan Rai Choudhary
 Krip Suri as Rahukaal
 Yash Pandit / Ashish Kapoor as Senapati Veer / Satyavan Rai Choudhary
 Sumana Das as Mishti
 Salil Ankola as Maharaj (Damyanti's Father)
 Suchita Trivedi as Maharani (Damyanti's Mother)
 Angad Hasija as Dev
 Reshmi Ghosh as Gulika
 Ahad Ali Aamir as Rajkumar Divateen
 Indrani Haldar as Leena Rai Choudhary / Vishghati
 Karan Suchak as Vikrant
 Utkarsha Naik as Damyanti's Mother
 Vahbbiz Dorabjee as Vishkamini
 Amit Behl as Senapati
 Puneet Vashisht as Dhumketu

References

2013 Indian television series debuts
2014 Indian television series endings
Life OK original programming
Indian drama television series
Indian supernatural television series
Indian fantasy television series
Indian romance television series
Television series based on Mahabharata
Savitri and Satyavan